The Southern Region is one of five regions of Malta. The region includes the southern part of the main island of Malta. The region borders the Northern, Central and South Eastern Regions.

It was created by the Act No. XVI of 2009 out of parts of Malta Majjistral and Malta Xlokk.

Subdivisions

Districts
Southern Region includes parts of the Northern Harbour District, South Eastern District, Southern Harbour District and Western Districts.

Local councils
Southern Region includes 14 local councils:
Birżebbuġa include the areas of Qajjenza, Tal-Papa, Bengħisa Battery, Ħal Far, and Għar Dalam
Għaxaq include the areas of Ħas-Saptan, Ħal Dmikki, Tal-Qattus and Tal-Millieri
Gudja include the areas of Bir Miftuħ , Tal-Mithna and Xlejli
Ħamrun include the areas of Blata l-Bajda and Rabbat
Kirkop
Luqa include the area of Ħal Farruġ
Mqabba
Qormi (Città Pinto) include the areas of Ħandaq and Tal-Ħlas
Qrendi include the areas of Maqluba, Wied iż-Żurrieq and Ħaġar Qim
Safi
Santa Luċija
Siġġiewi (Città Ferdinand) include the areas of Għar Lapsi, Fawwara and Girgenti
Żebbuġ (Città Rohan) include the areas of Ħal Muxi, Ħal Mula, Ħal Dwin
Żurrieq include the areas of Bubaqra, Nigret and Tal-Bebbux

Hamlets
Bubaqra
Ħal Farruġ

Regional Committee
The current Southern Regional Committee is made up of:

References

External links

Regions of Malta
States and territories established in 2009
2009 establishments in Malta